The following is a list of current affiliates of This TV, a general entertainment TV network.  This TV is currently carried on over-the-air TV stations in the United States, most of whom carry the network on a digital subchannel.  In some markets, This TV operates a secondary affiliation.

Current affiliates
Notes:
 1 Indicates station is a primary feed This TV affiliate.

Former affiliates

References

External links
ThisTV.com - Official website
MGM Links with Weigel Broadcasting for Digital Subchannel Offering, from Chicago Tribune, July 28, 2008